Lilleby is a railway station on Nordland Line located in Trondheim, Norway serving the area of Lademoen. The station is serviced by the Trøndelag Commuter Rail operated by SJ Norge. In 2006 the station changed its name from Lademoen so the Lademoen name could be used for the new station Lademoen located at Nedre Elvehavn. Lilleby was opened in 1967 and is 1.77 km from Trondheim Central Station. Lademoen is primarily a residential area.

External links
 Jernbaneverket page on Lilleby 

Railway stations on the Nordland Line
Railway stations in Trondheim
Railway stations opened in 1967
1967 establishments in Norway